Roberta Faccani (born 1 July 1968 in Ancona), is an Italian singer and actress.

Early career 
After placing second at the Castrocaro Music Festival in 1990, Faccani studied at the Centro Europeo di Toscolano (C.E.T.) led by famed lyricist Mogol, graduating in 1995.

In 2001, she released her first single, Rido, under the stage name Mata Faccani.

A musical theatre actress, Faccani played the role of Joanne in the Italian production of the famous Broadway musical Rent from 1999 to 2000, before being cast in Pinocchio il grande musical, directed by Saverio Marconi with music by Pooh in 2002.

With Matia Bazar 
In late 2004 Roberta replaced Silvia Mezzanotte as the lead singer of the famed group Matia Bazar, after signing a five-year contract; her first album with the band was Profili svelati (2005), preceded by the single Grido d'amore which earned the band the third place in the Group section at the Sanremo Music Festival 2005.

Two albums revisiting Matia Bazar's earlier repertoire, One1 Two2 Three3 Four4 (2007) and One1 Two2 Three3 Four4 – Volume 2, followed; on 29 April 2010, Faccani's departure from the group due to the expiry of her contract was announced.

Later solo career 
After leaving Matia Bazar, Faccani resumed her career as a musical theatre actress.
In 2007, she wrote lyrics and music (with composer Stefano Calabrese) for Streghe, un musical magico, while in 2010–11 she performed as the Queen of Hearts in Alice nel Paese delle Meraviglie – Il musical, to rave reviews.

Other highlights of Roberta's acting career are her roles as Lady Montague in the Italian adaptation of Roméo et Juliette (from 2013 to 2015 and again in 2018) and as Life and Death (double role) in Renato Zero's play Zerovskij, Solo per amore (2017).

Apart from acting, Faccani released three solo albums, Un po' matt(i)a, un po' no…controtempo live tour (live, 2012), Stato di grazia (2013) and Matrioska italiana (2017), performing at several venues with her group, Mataband.

Other activities 
In 2013, Faccani founded her music academy in Castelplanio, La fabbrica del cantante-attore, and a recording label, Bandidos Records (with Giordano Tittarelli), under which she released the single Lazio Generazione (2014) as a tribute to the football team managed by her late grand-uncle Augusto Faccani.

On 28 November 2014, she sang for Pope Francis in Rome before a worldwide audience during the Terram in pacis event.

Discography

With Matia Bazar
 Profili svelati (2005)
 One1 Two2 Three3 Four4 (2007)
 One1 Two2 Three3 Four4 – Volume 2 (2008)

Solo
 Un po' matt(i)a, un po' no…controtempo live tour (live, 2012)
 Stato di grazia (2013)
 Matrioska italiana (2017)

Notes

External links
 

1968 births
People from Ancona
Italian actresses
Living people
20th-century Italian women singers
21st-century Italian women singers